Bordone can refer to:

 Benedetto Bordone (1460–1531), Italian miniaturist and cartographer
 Paris Bordone, 16th-century Italian painter
 Richard P. Bordone (1930–2007), U.S. Navy captain and aviator
 Bourdon (organ pipe), in Italian usage
 Madonna del Bordone, 13th-century Italian panel painting